Andu Marian Moisi (born 12 August 1996) is a Romanian professional footballer who plays as a defender.

Club career

Politehnica Iași
In the summer of 2017, after helping CS Știința Miroslava secure promotion to the Romanian Liga II, Moisi returned to Politehnica Iași . He subsequently signed a new three-year contract with the Liga I club.

Honours

Știința Miroslava
Liga III: 2016–17

References

External links
 
 
 

1996 births
Living people
Sportspeople from Iași
Romanian footballers
Association football defenders
Liga I players
Liga II players
FC Politehnica Iași (1945) players
FC Politehnica Iași (2010) players
CS Știința Miroslava players
CS Național Sebiș players
CS Aerostar Bacău players
CSM Focșani players